The United States Patent and Trademark Office (USPTO) issues an annual "Patenting by Organizations" report on the agency's web site. This report contains a ranked list of all US and international organizations which received 40 or more US patents in the year the report was issued.

The following is a list of the top ten recipients of patents issued by the USPTO in the year indicated.

2015
 IBM, headquartered in Armonk, New York
 Samsung Electronics Co., headquartered in Suwon, Korea
 Canon Kabushiki Kaisha, headquartered in Tokyo, Japan
 QUALCOMM INC.
 GOOGLE, INC. 
 Toshiba Corporation, headquartered in Tokyo, Japan
 Sony Corporation, headquartered in Tokyo, Japan
 LG ELECTRONICS INC., headquartered in Seoul, Korea
 Intel Corporation, headquartered in Santa Clara, California
 Microsoft Corporation,  headquartered in Redmond, Washington

2014
7481 patents to IBM, headquartered in Armonk, New York
4936 patents to Samsung Electronics Co., headquartered in Suwon, Korea
4048 patents to Canon Kabushiki Kaisha, headquartered in Tokyo, Japan
3214 patents to Sony Corporation, headquartered in Tokyo, Japan
2829 patents to Microsoft Corporation,  headquartered in Redmond, Washington
2586 patents to QUALCOMM INC.
2566 patents to GOOGLE, INC. 
2537 patents to Toshiba Corporation, headquartered in Tokyo, Japan
2119 patents to LG ELECTRONICS INC., headquartered in Seoul, Korea
2079 patents to Matsushita Electric Industrial Co., Ltd., headquartered in Kadoma, Osaka, Japan

2012
6478 patents to IBM, headquartered in Armonk, New York
5043 patents to Samsung Electronics Co., headquartered in Suwon, Korea
3173 patents to Canon Kabushiki Kaisha, headquartered in Tokyo, Japan
3017 patents to Sony Corporation, headquartered in Tokyo, Japan
2748 patents to Matsushita Electric Industrial Co., Ltd., headquartered in Kadoma, Osaka, Japan
2610 patents to Microsoft Corporation,  headquartered in Redmond, Washington,
2415 patents to Toshiba Corporation, headquartered in Tokyo, Japan
1650 patents to General Electric Company, headquartered in Schenectady, New York
1617 patents to LG ELECTRONICS INC., headquartered in Seoul, Korea
1527 patents to Fujitsu Limited, headquartered in Tokyo

2011
6148 patents to IBM, headquartered in Armonk, New York
4968 patents to Samsung Electronics Co., headquartered in Suwon, Korea
2818 patents to Canon Kabushiki Kaisha, headquartered in Tokyo, Japan
2533 patents to Matsushita Electric Industrial Co., Ltd., headquartered in Kadoma, Osaka, Japan
2451 patents to Toshiba Corporation, headquartered in Tokyo, Japan
2309 patents to Microsoft Corporation,  headquartered in Redmond, Washington,
2265 patents to Sony Corporation, headquartered in Tokyo, Japan
1525 patents to SEIKO EPSON CORPORATION
1455 patents to Hitachi, Ltd., headquartered in Tokyo
1444 patents to General Electric Company, headquartered in Schenectady, New York

2010
5866 patents to IBM, headquartered in Armonk, New York
4518 patents to Samsung Electronics Co., headquartered in Suwon, Korea
3086 patents to Microsoft Corporation,  headquartered in Redmond, Washington,
2551 patents to Canon Kabushiki Kaisha, headquartered in Tokyo, Japan
2443 patents to Matsushita Electric Industrial Co., Ltd., headquartered in Kadoma, Osaka, Japan
2212 patents to Toshiba Corporation, headquartered in Tokyo, Japan
2130 patents to Sony Corporation, headquartered in Tokyo, Japan
1652 patents to Intel Corporation, headquartered in Santa Clara, California
1488 patents to LG ELECTRONICS INC., headquartered in Seoul, Korea
1480 patents to Hewlett-Packard, headquartered in Palo Alto, California

2009
4887 patents to IBM, headquartered in Armonk, New York
3592 patents to Samsung Electronics Co., headquartered in Daegu, Korea
2901 patents to Microsoft Corporation,  headquartered in Redmond, Washington,
2200 patents to Canon Kabushiki Kaisha, headquartered in Tokyo, Japan
1759 patents to Matsushita Electric Industrial Co., Ltd., headquartered in Kadoma, Osaka, Japan
1669 patents to Toshiba Corporation, headquartered in Tokyo, Japan
1656 patents to Sony Corporation, headquartered in Tokyo, Japan
1534 patents to Intel Corporation, headquartered in Santa Clara, California
1328 patents to SEIKO EPSON CORPORATION
1269 patents to Hewlett-Packard, headquartered in Palo Alto, California

2008
4169 patents to IBM, headquartered in Armonk, New York
3502 patents to Samsung Electronics Co., headquartered in Daegu, Korea
2107 patents to Canon Kabushiki Kaisha, headquartered in Tokyo, Japan
2026 patents to Microsoft Corporation
1772 patents to Intel Corporation, headquartered in Santa Clara, California
1575 patents to Toshiba Corporation, headquartered in Tokyo
1475 patents to Fujitsu Limited, headquartered in Tokyo
1469 patents to Matsushita Electric Industrial Co., Ltd., headquartered in Kadoma, Osaka, Japan
1461 patents to Sony Corporation
1422 patents to Hewlett-Packard, headquartered in Palo Alto, California

2007
3125 patents to IBM, headquartered in Armonk, New York, USA
2723 patents to Samsung Electronics Co., headquartered in Daegu, Korea
1983 patents to Canon Kabushiki Kaisha, headquartered in Tokyo, Japan
1910 patents to Matsushita Electric Industrial Co., Ltd., headquartered in Kadoma, Osaka, Japan
1864 patents to Intel Corporation, headquartered in Santa Clara, California
1637 patents to Microsoft Corporation
1519 patents to Toshiba Corporation, headquartered in Tokyo
1476 patents to Micron Technology, headquartered in Boise, Idaho
1466 patents to Hewlett-Packard, headquartered in Palo Alto, California
1455 patents to Sony Corporation

2006
3621 patents to IBM, headquartered in Armonk, New York
2451 patents to Samsung Electronics Co., headquartered in Daegu, Korea
2366 patents to Canon Kabushiki Kaisha, headquartered in Tokyo, Japan
2229 patents to Matsushita Electric Industrial Co., Ltd., headquartered in Kadoma, Osaka, Japan
2099 patents to Hewlett-Packard, headquartered in Palo Alto, California
1959 patents to Intel Corporation, headquartered in Santa Clara, California
1771 patents to Sony Corporation
1732 patents to Hitachi, Ltd., headquartered in Tokyo
1672 patents to Toshiba Corporation, headquartered in Tokyo
1610 patents to Micron Technology, headquartered in Boise, Idaho, USA

2005
2941 patents to IBM, headquartered in Armonk, New York, USA
1828 patents to Canon Kabushiki Kaisha, headquartered in Tokyo, Japan
1797 patents to Hewlett-Packard, headquartered in Palo Alto, California, USA
1688 patents to Matsushita Electric Industrial Co., Ltd., headquartered in Kadoma, Osaka, Japan
1641 patents to Samsung Electronics Co., headquartered in Daegu, Korea
1561 patents to Micron Technology, headquartered in Boise, Idaho
1549 patents to Intel Corporation, headquartered in Santa Clara, California
1271 patents to Hitachi, Ltd., headquartered in Tokyo
1258 patents to Toshiba Corporation, headquartered in Tokyo
1154 patents to Fujitsu Limited, headquartered in Tokyo

2004
3248 patents to IBM
1934 patents to Matsushita Electric Industrial Co., Ltd.
1805 patents to Canon Kabushiki Kaisha
1775 patents to Hewlett-Packard
1760 patents to Micron Technology
1604 patents to Samsung Electronics Co.
1601 patents to Intel Corporation
1514 patents to Hitachi, Ltd.
1310 patents to Toshiba Corporation
1305 patents to Sony Corporation

2003
3415 patents to IBM
1992 patents to Canon Kabushiki Kaisha
1893 patents to Hitachi, Ltd.
1786 patents to Matsushita Electric Industrial Co.
1759 patents to Hewlett-Packard
1707 patents to Micron Technology
1592 patents to Intel Corporation
1353 patents to Royal Philips Electronics
1313 patents to Samsung Electronics Co.
1311 patents to Sony Corporation

2002
3288 patents to IBM
1893 patents to Canon Kabushiki Kaisha
1833 patents to Micron Technology
1821 patents to NEC Corporation
1601 patents to Hitachi, Ltd.
1544 patents to Matsushita Electric Industrial Co.
1434 patents to Sony Corporation
1416 patents to General Electric Company
1373 patents to Mitsubishi Denki K.K.
1328 patents to Samsung Electronics

2001
3411 patents to IBM
1953 patents to NEC Corporation
1877 patents to Canon Kabushiki Kaisha
1643 patents to Micron Technology
1450 patents to Samsung Electronics
1440 patents to Matsushita Electric Industrial Co.
1363 patents to Sony Corporation
1271 patents to Hitachi, Ltd.
1184 patents to Mitsubishi Denki K.K
1166 patents to Fujitsu, headquartered in Tokyo

2000
2886 patents to IBM
2021 patents to NEC Corporation
1890 patents to Canon Kabushiki Kaisha
1441 patents to Samsung Electronics
1411 patents to Lucent Technologies
1385 patents to Sony Corporation
1304 patents to Micron Technology
1232 patents to Toshiba
1196 patents to Motorola
1147 patents to Fujitsu

1999
2756 patents to IBM
1842 patents to NEC Corporation
1795 patents to Canon Kabushiki Kaisha
1545 patents to Samsung Electronics
1410 patents to Sony Corporation
1200 patents to Toshiba
1192 patents to Fujitsu
1192 patents to Motorola
1152 patents to Lucent Technologies
1054 patents to Mitsubishi Denki K.K.

1998
2657 patents to IBM
1928 patents to Canon Kabushiki Kaisha
1627 patents to NEC Corporation
1406 patents to Motorola
1316 patents to Sony Corporation
1304 patents to Samsung Electronics
1189 patents to Fujitsu
1170 patents to Toshiba
1124 patents to Eastman Kodak Co.
1094 patents to Hitachi, Ltd.

1997
1724 patents to IBM
1381 patents to Canon Kabushiki Kaisha
1095 patents to NEC Corporation
1058 patents to Motorola
903 patents to Fujitsu
903 patents to Hitachi, Ltd.
892 patents to Mitsubishi Denki K.K
862 patents to Toshiba
859 patents to Sony Corporation
795 patents to Eastman Kodak Co.

References

"Patenting by Organizations: 2014". United States Patent and Trademark Office. Retrieved January 13, 2016.
"Patenting by Organizations : 2013". United States Patent and Trademark Office
"Reports By Patenting Organization". United States Patent and Trademark Office. Retrieved February 1, 2013.
"Patenting by Organizations: 2011". United States Patent and Trademark Office. Retrieved February 1, 2013.
"Patenting by Organizations: 2010". United States Patent and Trademark Office. Retrieved February 1, 2013.
"Patenting by Organizations: 2009". United States Patent and Trademark Office. Retrieved February 1, 2013.
"Patenting by Organizations: 2008". United States Patent and Trademark Office. Retrieved February 1, 2013.
"Patenting by Organizations: 2007". United States Patent and Trademark Office. Retrieved February 1, 2013.
"Patenting by Organizations: 2006". United States Patent and Trademark Office. Retrieved February 1, 2013.
"Patenting by Organizations: 2005". United States Patent and Trademark Office. Retrieved February 1, 2013.
"Patenting by Organizations: 2004". United States Patent and Trademark Office. Retrieved February 1, 2013.
"Patenting by Organizations: 2003". United States Patent and Trademark Office. Retrieved February 1, 2013.
"Patenting by Organizations: 2002". United States Patent and Trademark Office. Retrieved February 1, 2013.
"Patenting by Organizations: 2001". United States Patent and Trademark Office. Retrieved February 1, 2013.
"Patenting by Organizations: 2000". United States Patent and Trademark Office. Retrieved February 1, 2013.
"Patenting by Organizations: 1999". United States Patent and Trademark Office. Retrieved February 1, 2013.
"Patenting by Organizations: 1998". United States Patent and Trademark Office. Retrieved February 1, 2013.
"Patenting by Organizations: 1997". United States Patent and Trademark Office. Retrieved February 1, 2013.
"Patenting by Organizations: 1996". United States Patent and Trademark Office. Retrieved February 1, 2013.
"Patenting by Organizations: 1995". United States Patent and Trademark Office. Retrieved February 1, 2013.

External links
 United States Patent & Trademark Office – official website

Patent recipients
Top United States patent recipients
Economy-related lists of superlatives